A drawing-in frame was a piece of equipment used in the cotton industry. It was the drawers-in job to thread each of ends on a new beam through the correct healds, and then though the reed. On a Lancashire loom weaving grey cloth, this was a simple but time-consuming task, but for a complex pattern on a Jacquard tapestry loom, great care was needed. To do this, the new beam was mounted on the back of a drawing-in frame, the healds were held next in a vertical position, and in front the reed would be clamped. This job was done by a reacher-in and a loomer. The reacher-in, who would be young and usually a boy, passed each end in order to the loomer, who threaded it through the healds and the reed.
  
A 'drawer-in' was sometimes referred to as a beamer.  The drawers-in  sat between the two beams on low three legged stool, head and shoulders at beam height and so surrounded was humorously given the nickname “Yutick’s nest.”

References
Footnotes

Citations

Bibliography

Cotton industry